At the 1952 Winter Olympics, two bobsleigh events were contested. The two-man competition was held on Thursday and Friday, 14 and 15 February 1952 while the four-man competition was held on Thursday and Friday, 21 and 22 February 1952.

Medal summary

Participating nations
Belgium only competed in the two-man event and Argentina only competed in the four-man event. 25 bobsledders competed in both events.

A total of 71 bobsledders from ten nations competed at the Oslo Games:

Medal table

References

External links
1952 bobsleigh two-man results
1952 bobsleigh four-man results

 
1952 Winter Olympics
1952 Winter Olympics events
Olympics
Bobsleigh in Norway